Alex Connor Finney (born 6 June 1996) is an English footballer who plays as a centre-back for Ebbsfleet United. He previously played for Bolton Wanderers, Queens Park Rangers, Maidstone United and Aldershot Town.

Career

Bolton Wanderers
Finney began his career with Bolton Wanderers. He started in the youth ranks at Leyton Orient before joining Bolton in 2014. He made his debut for the club on 19 September 2015 when he came on as a late substitute for Stephen Dobbie in Bolton's 4–1 defeat to Huddersfield Town. He left the club by mutual consent on 12 August 2016, three days after appearing in a League Cup defeat at Blackpool.

Queens Park Rangers
After being without a club for 3 months Finney signed for Queens Park Rangers on 18 November 2016.

He left the club at the end of the 2017/18 season, failing to make a senior appearance.

Maidstone United
On 3 August 2017, it was announced that Finney would play for Maidstone United on loan until 6 January 2018, he was ruled out of the final few weeks of his loan after breaking his jaw in two places on Boxing Day 2017. On 22 January it was announced that Maidstone United would be extending Finney's loan until the end of the 2017/18 season. Finney was named Maidstone United's Player of the Season. On 18 June 2018 it was announced that Finney had signed a two-year deal to stay at Maidstone

Aldershot Town
On 21 December 2018, Aldershot Town announced the signing of Finney from Maidstone United.

Ebbsfleet United
On 28 July 2021, Finney joined National League South side Ebbsfleet United.

Career statistics

References

External links

1996 births
Footballers from Huddersfield
Living people
English footballers
Association football defenders
Leyton Orient F.C. players
Bolton Wanderers F.C. players
Queens Park Rangers F.C. players
Maidstone United F.C. players
Aldershot Town F.C. players
Ebbsfleet United F.C. players
English Football League players
National League (English football) players